Olomoucké tvarůžky, also known as olomoucké syrečky, English: Olomouc cheese, Olomouc curd cheese) is a ripened soft cheese made in Loštice, Olomouc Region, Czech Republic. The cheese is very easy to recognize by its strong scent, distinctive pungent taste and yellowish colour. It is named after the city of Olomouc where it was originally sold.

Production
Tvarůžky is made from skimmed cow's milk without adding rennet, colourings, flavourings and stabilizers, and contains only 0.5% of fat.

History

The first written mention of this cheese is from 1452. In 1583, the name tvarůžky appeared for the first time.

Until the 19th century, Olomoucké tvarůžky was produced in the villages surrounding Olomouc, and was generally regarded as a peasant food. It was at this time that the cheese began to be referred to as Olomouc curd cheese. The A. W. Company has been making this cheese since 1876.

In the first decades of the 20th century there were still several dairies in Loštice that produced the cheese. Until the Holocaust some were belong to Jewish families: Langer, Eckstein, Klein and Wischnitzer. 

Since 2010, 'Olomoucké tvarůžky' has been registered as a Protected Geographical Indication by the European Union.

In 2016, a shop in Loštice began producing a variety of ice cream based on the cheese.

Tourism

There is a museum devoted to the cheese at the A. W. Company production plant in Loštice.

See also

 Harzer

References

External links

Traditional Czech products - Olomouc curd cheese

Czech cheeses
Šumperk District
Smear-ripened cheeses
Cheeses with designation of origin protected in the European Union
Cow's-milk cheeses
Peasant food